Farlington Marshes is a   Local Nature Reserve in Portsmouth in Hampshire. It is owned by Portsmouth City Council and managed by Hampshire and Isle of Wight Wildlife Trust. It is part of Langstone Harbour, which is a Site of Special Scientific Interest and a Nature Conservation Review site, Grade I. It is also part of Solent Maritime Special Area of Conservation and of Chichester and Langstone Harbours Ramsar site and Special Protection Area.

Farlington Marshes is an area of reclaimed land in Langstone harbour. It was reclaimed from the harbour in 1771 and includes a larger part of what was formerly Binner's Island (the remainder of the island is now referred to as North Binness Island). Farlington Marshes is about 120 hectares in size and features both freshwater marsh and brackish marsh. It is a feeding ground for overwintering Brent geese. During World War 2 it was used as a starfish site acting as a decoy for Portsea Island. The control blockhouses remain on the marshes.

References

Hampshire and Isle of Wight Wildlife Trust
Local Nature Reserves in Hampshire